"Solo Flight" is a 1941 instrumental song by Benny Goodman and His Orchestra.  The instrumental on the Columbia label, featured guitarist, Charlie Christian, and was released in early 1944.  "Solo Flight" peaked at number sixteen on the pop charts and was number one on the Harlem Hit Parade.

References

1941 songs
Benny Goodman songs
Instrumentals